Matthew Francis Brady (January 15, 1893 – September 20, 1959) was an American prelate of the Roman Catholic Church. He served as bishop of the Diocese of Burlington in Vermont (1938–1944) and bishop of the Diocese of Manchester in New Hampshire (1944–1959).

Biography

Early life 
Matthew Brady was born on January 15, 1893, in Waterbury, Connecticut, to John and Catherine (née Caffrey) Brady. After attending St. Thomas Seminary in Hartford, Connecticut, he studied at the American College of the Immaculate Conception in Leuven, Belgium.  Returning to the United States, Brady entered St. Bernard's Seminary in Rochester, New York.

Priesthood 
Brady was ordained to the priesthood for the Diocese of Hartford by Bishop John Nilan on June 10, 1916. During World War I, Brady served as a chaplain in the United States Army from 1916 to 1918. After his discharge from the army, he did pastoral work in the Diocese of Hartford, and served as a professor at St. Thomas Seminary in Bloomfield, Connecticut, from 1922 to 1932.

Bishop of Burlington 
On July 30, 1938, Brady was appointed the fourth bishop of the Diocese of Burlington by Pope Pius XI. He received his episcopal consecration on October 26, 1938, from Archbishop Amleto Cicognani, with Bishops Maurice F. McAuliffe and Joseph McCarthy serving as co-consecrators, at the Cathedral of the Immaculate Conception in Burlington, Vermont. Brady organized branches in his diocese of the Boy Scouts of America and the Catholic Youth Organization, and erected about a dozen new parishes in Fairfax, Gilman, North Troy, Orleans, and South Burlington, all in Vermont.

Bishop of Manchester 
Brady was named the fifth bishop of the Diocese of Manchester by Pope Pius XII on November 11, 1944. He presided over a period of unprecedented growth in the diocese, founding 27 parishes in 11 years and authorizing the construction of nearly 50 churches and numerous schools, convents, and other facilities. The number of parishioners increased by 50,000, and the number of priests and religious from around 650 to over 1,600. For all these accomplishments he was nicknamed "Brady the Builder."

Death and legacy 
Matthew Brady died in Manchester on September 20, 1959, at age 66. Bishop Brady High School in Concord, New Hampshire, and Brady Hall at Saint Anselm College in Goffstown, New Hampshire, are named in his honor.

References

1893 births
1959 deaths
Catholics from Connecticut
St. Bernard's School of Theology and Ministry alumni
St. Thomas Seminary alumni
People from Waterbury, Connecticut
Roman Catholic bishops of Burlington
Roman Catholic bishops of Manchester
20th-century Roman Catholic bishops in the United States
KU Leuven alumni
American College of the Immaculate Conception alumni
World War I chaplains
United States Army chaplains